The William Bush House, at 1927 Tunnel Hill Rd. in Elizabethtown, Kentucky, is a historic house built in 1817.  It was listed on the National Register of Historic Places in 1988.

It is a two-story Federal style house built in stages. In 1817 a brick three-bay two-story central passage plan house was built.  During the 1820s and 1830s lateral additions resulted in a seven-bay two-story house, with the additions including matching brick corbelling at the cornice and other matching details.  A porch with Doric columns was added c.1910.

It was deemed "a notable example of an early 19th century brick residence" and is one of the oldest homes in the city limits of Elizabethtown.  It is also notable for ties to early settler William Bush.

References

Houses on the National Register of Historic Places in Kentucky
Federal architecture in Kentucky
Houses completed in 1817
Elizabethtown, Kentucky
National Register of Historic Places in Hardin County, Kentucky
Houses in Hardin County, Kentucky
Central-passage houses
1817 establishments in Kentucky